Flint Metro League (FML) is a high school sports league in the Flint area of Michigan. It is composed of twelve high schools.

History
In 1968, six Flint area schools formed a new league to play against schools of similar size and to cut down on travel for some schools. Two teams, Fenton and Swartz Creek, joined from the County B League, and one each from the Big Nine Conference (Ainsworth), Wayne-Oakland League (Holly) and Tri-County League (Lapeer High) and a new high school: Carman. The league in 1983 contained 10 schools but by 2002 there were seven teams. Clio in 2005 and Swartz Creek in 2006 moved to the Flint Metro League as the conference was perceived as being overpowering to those schools.

In 2006, the entire Big Nine Conference applied for membership in the league to encourage discussion on a merger. As a result of that and Kearsley's interest back in 2005–2006, a membership invitation was extended to Kearsley.

In 2014, Flushing Schools joined the Flint Metro League from the Saginaw Valley Conference, replacing Lapeer East and West, which merged into Lapeer High and left the FML, while in 2017, Owosso High School joined the FML after leaving the Capital Area Activities Conference.

In 2019, three members of the Genesee Area Conference left that conference to join the Flint Metro League, expanding the league to twelve teams and two divisions.

Member schools

Current members

Former members

Football
This list goes through the 2016 season.

Basketball

References

Michigan high school sports conferences
High school sports conferences and leagues in the United States